Leo Joseph "Red" Murphy (January 7, 1889 – August 12, 1960) was a catcher in Major League Baseball who played for the Pittsburgh Pirates during the  season. He was born in Terre Haute, Indiana.

Murphy started his professional career in 1912 with Double-A Columbus Senators of the American Association. He spent three years in the Minor leagues before joining the Pirates early in the 1915 season. While in Pittsburgh, he served as a backup for regular catcher George Gibson. He hit .098 (4-for-41) in 31 games, including four RBI and four runs scored.

Following his majors career, Murphy returned to minor league action for five more years between 1916 and 1927. In a nine-season career, he was a .255 hitter with 15 home runs in 801 games. He later coached in the minors and also managed during five years in the All-American Girls Professional Baseball League for  the Racine Belles, leading them to three consecutive playoff appearances, including the Championship Title in 1946. He posted a combined 310–259 record for a .554 winning percentage.

Murphy was a longtime resident of Racine, Wisconsin, where he died at the age of 71.

Fact
 The All-American Girls Professional Baseball League folded in 1954, but there is now a permanent display at the Baseball Hall of Fame and Museum at Cooperstown, New York since November 5, 1988 that honors those who were part of this unique experience. Murphy, along with the rest of the league, is now enshrined in the Hall.

References

Sources
All-American Girls Professional Baseball League entry
Baseball.Reference.com – major league statistics
Baseball.Reference.com – minor league statistics

Major League Baseball catchers
Pittsburgh Pirates players
Columbus Senators players
Fargo-Moorhead Graingrowers players
Kalamazoo Kazoos players
Milwaukee Brewers (minor league) players
Waco Cubs players
Winona Pirates players
All-American Girls Professional Baseball League managers
Baseball players from Indiana
Sportspeople from Terre Haute, Indiana
Sportspeople from Racine, Wisconsin
1889 births
1960 deaths